Luís Carlos de Oliveira Preto (born 17 September 1965), commonly known as Pintado, is a Brazilian football coach and former player who played as a defensive midfielder. He is the current head coach of Juventude.

Playing career
Born in Bragança Paulista, São Paulo, Pintado started his career with hometown side Bragantino in 1983. He left the club in the following year after having unpaid wages, and spent a 45-day trial at Palmeiras before signing for São Paulo.

After featuring rarely, Pintado was loaned to Taubaté before returning to Braga in 1987, also on loan. Mainly a right back, he played in all positions in the defense before being converted into a defensive midfielder by manager Carlos Alberto Parreira.

Upon returning, Pintado featured more regularly before moving abroad in 1993, with Mexican side Cruz Azul. He also had a short loan stint at Santos in 1995, but left Los Celestes permanently in 1997.

After a period with Minas Gerais sides América Mineiro and Atlético Mineiro, Pintado moved to Japan in 1998 with Cerezo Osaka. He would return to his home country in the following year, and subsequently represented Portuguesa, América Mineiro, Democrata de Governador Valadares, Internacional de Limeira, Bragantino, União São João, Pelotas, Santa Cruz and Brasiliense.

Managerial career
Shortly after retiring, Pintado started working as a manager at one of his former clubs, Inter de Limeira, where he won the Campeonato Paulista Série A2. After returning to former team América in July of that year, he was unable to avoid his side's relegation from the Série B.

Pintado subsequently worked at Atlético Sorocaba, Inter de Limeira, Rio Branco-SP, Taubaté, Rio Branco de Andradas and Noroeste before taking over Paraná on 18 May 2007. He left the club in July, after only nine matches after accepting an offer from an Emirati club.

Pintado took over Ituano in January 2008, but resigned on 24 February. The following day, he was appointed in charge of São Caetano, but was dismissed on 9 July. Six days later, he was named at the helm of Náutico, but was sacked on 8 August; he ended the year at Figueirense, after being named manager of the side in November.

Sacked by Figueira on 2 March 2009, Pintado had a short stint at Mirassol before taking over Ponte Preta on 25 May. He was relieved from his duties on 29 August, and returned to Mirassol on 28 October for the ensuing campaign.

Pintado resigned from Mirassol on 13 March 2010, and moved abroad with Club León on 1 September. He returned to Brazil on 1 December to join Santo André, but left his post the following 20 February. Two days later, he took over Linense.

Pintado left Linense on 16 April 2012, and was named manager of Guaratinguetá on 18 June. He opted to leave the club on 15 August, and was appointed in charge of CRB four days later; on 1 October, he was sacked.

Pintado worked at Penapolense, América de Natal and São Caetano during the 2013 season, before returning to Mexico to work as an assistant manager at Cruz Azul.

On 23 August 2015, Pintado was appointed Guarani manager, but left the following 3 April to return to former club São Paulo, as an assistant. While at the latter club, he was an interim manager on two occasions.

Pintado returned to managerial duties on 6 February 2018, after taking over São Caetano for a third spell. He was dismissed by the club after suffering relegation in the 2019 Campeonato Paulista, and returned to Figueirense on 14 October; he led the side to a nine-match unbeaten run, which helped them to avoid relegation, but still left on 6 December.

On 31 January 2020, Pintado was named manager of Água Santa, but left on 27 March to take over Juventude. The following 1 February, after achieving top tier promotion, he left the club and was named in charge of Ferroviária.

Pintado resigned from AFE on 26 April 2021, and took over Goiás three days later. He left the club on 18 July, and was appointed in charge of Chapecoense on 4 August.

On 26 October 2021, with Chape in the last position, Pintado left on a mutual agreement. The following 4 January, he took over Cuiabá also in the top tier.

Pintado won the Campeonato Matogrossense with Cuiabá, but was sacked on 12 May 2022. He then worked at his first club Inter de Limeira during the 2023 Campeonato Paulista, before returning to Juventude on 11 March of that year.

Career statistics

Managerial statistics

Honours

Player
 São Paulo
Campeonato Paulista: 1985, 1990 e 1992
Copa Libertadores: 1992, 1993
Intercontinental Cup: 1992

 Cruz Azul
Copa México: 1996–97

 América Mineiro
 Copa Sul-Minas: 2000

Manager
 Inter de Limeira
 Campeonato Paulista Série A2: 2004

 Cuiabá
 Campeonato Mato-Grossense: 2022

References

External links

1965 births
Living people
Brazilian footballers
Brazilian football managers
Campeonato Brasileiro Série A players
Liga MX players
J1 League players
Brazilian expatriate footballers
Brazilian expatriate sportspeople in Mexico
Brazilian expatriate sportspeople in Japan
Expatriate footballers in Mexico
Expatriate footballers in Japan
Campeonato Brasileiro Série A managers
Campeonato Brasileiro Série B managers
Campeonato Brasileiro Série C managers
Clube Atlético Bragantino players
São Paulo FC players
Esporte Clube Taubaté players
Cruz Azul footballers
Santos FC players
América Futebol Clube (MG) players
Clube Atlético Mineiro players
Cerezo Osaka players
Associação Portuguesa de Desportos players
Esporte Clube Democrata players
Associação Atlética Internacional (Limeira) players
União São João Esporte Clube players
Santa Cruz Futebol Clube players
Brasiliense Futebol Clube players
Esporte Clube Pelotas players
Associação Atlética Internacional (Limeira) managers
América Futebol Clube (MG) managers
Clube Atlético Sorocaba managers
Esporte Clube Taubaté managers
Rio Branco de Andradas Futebol Clube managers
Esporte Clube Noroeste managers
Paraná Clube managers
Associação Desportiva São Caetano managers
Clube Náutico Capibaribe managers
Figueirense FC managers
Mirassol Futebol Clube managers
Associação Atlética Ponte Preta managers
Club León managers
Ituano FC managers
Esporte Clube Santo André managers
Clube Atlético Linense managers
Guaratinguetá Futebol managers
Clube de Regatas Brasil managers
Clube Atlético Penapolense managers
América Futebol Clube (RN) managers
Guarani FC managers
Association football midfielders
Esporte Clube Água Santa managers
Associação Ferroviária de Esportes managers
Goiás Esporte Clube managers
Associação Chapecoense de Futebol managers
Cuiabá Esporte Clube managers
São Paulo FC non-playing staff
People from Bragança Paulista